Hyptidendron is a genus of plants in the family Lamiaceae, first described in 1849. The entire genus is endemic to South America.

Species
Hyptidendron amethystoides (Benth.) Harley - eastern Brazil
Hyptidendron arboreum (Benth.) Harley - Guyana, Venezuela, Colombia, Ecuador, Peru, northwestern Brazil
Hyptidendron arbusculum (Epling) Harley - Brazil
Hyptidendron asperrimum (Spreng.) Harley - eastern Brazil
Hyptidendron canum (Pohl ex Benth.) Harley - Brazil, Bolivia
Hyptidendron caudatum (Epling & Játiva) Harley - Brazil
Hyptidendron claussenii (Benth.) Harley - Minas Gerais
Hyptidendron conspersum (Benth.) Harley - Bahia
Hyptidendron dictiocalyx (Benth.) Harley - Goiás
Hyptidendron eximium (Epling) Harley & J.F.B.Pastore - Mato Grosso
Hyptidendron glutinosum (Benth.) Harley - Brazil, Bolivia
Hyptidendron leucophyllum (Pohl ex Benth.) Harley - southern Brazil
Hyptidendron rhabdocalyx (Mart. ex Benth.) Harley - southern Brazil
Hyptidendron rondonicum (Harley) Harley - Brazil
Hyptidendron unilaterale (Epling) Harley - southern Brazil
Hyptidendron vauthieri (Briq.) Harley - southern Brazil
Hyptidendron vepretorum (Mart. ex Benth.) Harley - Minas Gerais

References

Lamiaceae
Lamiaceae genera